is a male Japanese former Volleyball player who played for Panasonic Panthers in V.League Division 1. He used to be the captain of Japanese youth national team and was a part of Japan men's national volleyball team.

Personal life 
Hisahara has two older brothers, the one is Daiki Hisahara, and his father was an elementary school Volleyball coach. So, he started playing Volleyball influenced by his family.

Career 
He was attended to the Jokoji Volleyball Sports Boy Scouts, where his father was a coach.

When he entered , his physical growth expanded his range of play, and he was selected as a representative under-category and gradually gained confidence. He frequently participated in the All Japan High School Volleyball Championship (Spring High) and the National High School Comprehensive Athletic Meet (Inter-High). He was captain for the third year.

In the third year, the team won the Emperor's Cup and Empress' Cup All Japan Volleyball Championship title after beating JTEKT Stings, who were in Japanese highest league , with a set count of 3–1. In 2016, when he was in his fourth year, he was first elected to Japan senior national team and was also the captain of the college's volleyball club. At the end of the same year, he became an informal player of the Panasonic Panthers.

In the 2016–17 V.Premier League, he was registered as an informal player. On January 7, 2017, his V.League first appearance was in the game against Toyota Synthetic Trefelsa (currently is Wolf Dogs Nagoya). In the following 2017–18 season, he often participated in games while being a rookie.

In 2017, he was elected to represent Japan at the 29th Universiade Tournament and contributed to the team's bronze medal.

In the 2018–19 season, Tatsuya Fukuzawa, who has the same position with Hisahara, was withdrawn in the middle of the season, and from there he got many opportunities to play in the league. He became a starting member in the final game of the season, the team won the championship and achieved the second consecutive league title. He also participated in the 2019 Asian Men's Club Volleyball Championship as a main player.

In the 2019–20 season, he made a leap forward in the Japan national team and also participated in the 2019 FIVB Volleyball Men's World Cup. For V.League in the same season, Fukuzawa moved to Paris Volley in France, so it made him became a regular player from the beginning of the league. Then, he converted to a professional player from June 1, 2020.

In the latter half of March 2021, he had an ill at the end of 2020–21 V.League 1 and missed the game after March 21. He also missed the semi–finals and final matches and was also excluded from the 2021 Japan national team roster.

He came back in the game competing with FC Tokyo on March 26, 2022, which Panthers won over the opponent. Later on April 19, there was announced that Hisahara would retire from an active player and was assigned to be the Japanese women's national team's assistant coach. By the way, he still being the Panthers' member for the support.

International tournaments

National team 
 Japan men's national under-19 volleyball team (2012–2013)
 2012 Asian Youth Boys Volleyball Championship
 2013 FIVB Volleyball Boys' U19 World Championship
 Japan men's national under-21 volleyball team (2013)
 2013 FIVB Volleyball Men's U21 World Championship
 Japan men's national under-20 volleyball team (2014)
 2014 Asian Men's U20 Volleyball Championship
 Japan men's national under-23 volleyball team (2015)
 2015 Asian Men's U23 Volleyball Championship
 2016 Asian Men's Volleyball Cup
2017 Eastern Asian Men's Volleyball Championship
 Japan universiade national team (2017)
2017 Summer Universiade
 Japan men's national volleyball team (2014, 2016–2020)
 2014 Asian Men's Volleyball Cup (2014)
 2019 FIVB Volleyball Men's Nations League
 2019 FIVB Volleyball Men's World Cup

Club team 
 2019 Asian Men's Club Volleyball Championship

Awards

Club team 
 2017–18 V.Premier League —  Champion, with Panasonic Panthers
 2018–19 V.League 1 —  Champion, with Panasonic Panthers
 2019–20 V.League 1 —  Runners-up, with Panasonic Panthers
 2019 Asian Men's Club Volleyball Championship —  Runners-up, with Panasonic Panthers

References

See also 
 バレーボール日本代表の久原翼、プロ契約を機に食意識もプロ級に at athleterecipe.com
 半生の出来事を視覚化し、モチベーション低下を克服。バレーボール選手としての使命を再確認したコーチング at highflyers.nu

1995 births
Japanese men's volleyball players
Living people
Sportspeople from Hyōgo Prefecture
Tokai University alumni
Medalists at the 2017 Summer Universiade